The minister of health is the minister of the Crown in the Canadian Cabinet who is responsible for overseeing health-focused government agencies including Health Canada and the Public Health Agency of Canada, as well as enforcing the Canada Health Act, the law governing Canada's universal health care system.  The current minister is Jean-Yves Duclos. 

The minister of health is responsible for maintaining and improving the health of Canadians. The minister is responsible for the Health Portfolio, which comprises:

 Canadian Food Inspection Agency
 Canadian Institutes of Health Research
 Health Canada
 Patented Medicine Prices Review Board
 Public Health Agency of Canada

The Health Portfolio consists of approximately 12,500 full-time equivalent employees and an annual budget of over $3.8 billion.

History

The first Department of Health was established in 1919, and unlike most other departments, had no designated minister. The president of the Privy Council was the first designated to manage the department, which was followed by the minister of immigration and colonization in 1921 under Arthur Meighen, then the minister of soldiers' civil re-establishment later that year under William Lyon Mackenzie King. The minister of soldiers' civil re-establishment managed the Department of Health through the next Meighen and King governments.

In 1928, the Department of Health and minister of soldiers' civil re-establishment were abolished and replaced with the Department and minister of pensions and national health. In 1944, the position was again split into two roles, with the war veteran portfolio going to the minister of veterans affairs, and the rest of the portfolio moving to the minister of national health and welfare.

The role of minister of national health and welfare was abolished in 1996, and replaced with the current minister of health. Jane Philpott was the first medical doctor to hold the post.

List of ministers
Key:

Health Portfolio 
Along with Health Canada, the portfolio consists of: the Public Health Agency of Canada (PHAC), Canadian Institutes of Health Research, Patented Medicine Prices Review Board. and the Canadian Food Inspection Agency.

Department hierarchies 
The hierarchy of the Ministry is listed below.

Minister of Health
Deputy Minister
Chief Medical Advisor
Director General, Office of Audit and Evaluation
Departmental Audit Committee
Internal Audit and Special Examinations
Program Evaluation Division
Performance Measurement Planning and Integration
Practice Management
 
Health Products and Food Branch
Director General, Biologics & Genetic Therapies Directorate
Director General, Food Directorate
Bureau of Chemical Safety
Bureau of Nutritional Sciences
Bureau of Microbial Hazards
Bureau of Policy Intergovernmental & International Affairs
Bureau of Food Surveillance & Science Integration
Bureau of Business Systems & Operations
Director General, Marketed Health Products Directorate
Bureau of Strategic Engagement and Integrated Management Services
Health Products Surveillance and Epidemiology Bureau
Marketed Biologicals, Biotechnology and Natural Health Products Bureau
Marketed Pharmaceuticals Bureau
Office of Policy, Risk Advisory, & Advertising
Director General, Medical Devices Directorate
Bureau of Licensing Services
Bureau of Investigation Testing Authorization, Special Access Program & Post-Market Surveillance
Bureau of Evaluation
Bureau of Planning & Operations
Bureau of Policy & International Programs
Director General, Natural & Non-prescription Health Products Directorate
Bureau of Licensing Services & Systems
Bureau of Product Review & Assessment
Bureau of Strategic Planning & Business Services
Bureau of Program Policy, Risk Management & Stakeholder Engagement
Bureau of Consumer Health Product Modernization
Director General, Office of Nutrition Policy & Promotion
Director General, Policy, Planning & International Affairs Directorate
Strategic Horizontal Policy Division
Office of Legislative and Regulatory Modernization
Director General, Resource Management & Operations Directorate
Strategic Planning and Accountability Division
Operational Management and Scientific Learning Division
Transformation and Business Informatics Division
Governance and Internal Communications Division
Office of Submissions and Intellectual Property
Director General, Therapeutic Products Directorate
Bureau of Cardiology, Allergy & Neurological Sciences
Bureau of Gastroenterology, Infection and Viral Diseases 
Bureau of Metabolism, Oncology and Reproductive Sciences
Bureau of Pharmaceutical Sciences
Bureau of Policy, Science and International Programs
Bureau of Medical Sciences
Office of Planning, Performance and Review Services
Office of Clinical Trials 
Director General, Veterinary Drugs Directorate
Human Safety Division
Manufacturing and Chemical Evaluation Division
Clinical Evaluation Division
Submission and Knowledge Management Division
Policy, Planning and International Affairs Division
 
Healthy Environments and Consumer Safety Branch
Director General, Consumer Product Safety Directorate
Director, Risk Assessment Bureau
Director, Risk Management Bureau
Director, Program Development Bureau
Environmental and Radiation Health Sciences Directorate
Office of Management Services
Science Secretariat
Director, Environmental Health Science & Research Bureau, Chemicals Surveillance Bureau
Director, Radiation Protection Bureau
Director, Consumer & Clinical Radiation Protection Bureau
Director General, Policy Planning and Integration Directorate
Director General, Safe Environments Directorate
 
Opioid Response Team
Controlled Substances Directorate
Opioid Response Team Directorate

Assistant Deputy Minister
Regulatory Operations and Enforcement Branch
Cannabis Directorate
Laboratories Directorate
Planning and Operations Directorate
Health Product Compliance Directorate
Policy and Regulatory Strategies Directorate
Medical Devices and Clinical Compliance Directorate
Consumer Product Safety, Tobacco and Pesticides Directorate
Controlled Substances and Environmental Health Directorate

 
Communications & Public Affairs Branch
Ethics & Internal Ombudsman Services
Marketing and Communications Services Directorate
Planning & Operations Division
Public Affairs & Strategic Communications Directorate
Stakeholder Relations & Consultation Directorate

Pest Management Regulatory Agency
Strategic Policy Branch
Controlled Substances and Cannabis Branch
Corporate Services Branch
Departmental Secretariat

Executive Director & Senior General Counsel, Legal Services

Chief Financial Officer Branch
Departmental Performance Measurement & Evaluation Directorate
Departmental Resource Management Directorate
Financial Operations Directorate
Exec. Director, Financial Management
Accounting Operations & Systems
Financial Services Division, First Nations & Inuit Health Branch
Public Accounts & Policy
Internal Control Division
Materiel & Assets Management Directorate
Planning & Corporate Management Practices Directorate
President of the Canadian Food Inspection Agency

Vice-President, Operations
Assoc. Vice-President, Operations
Vice-President, Science 
Chief Veterinary Officer
Chief Science Operating Officer
Vice-President, Policy & Programs
Chief Food Safety Officer (Exec. Director, Food Safety & Consumer Protection Division)
Chief Plant Health Officer (Exec. Director, Plant Health & Biosecurity Directorate)

VP, Innovation, Business & Service Development
Chief Information Officer
VP, Communications & Public Affairs
VP, Human Resources
VP, Corporate Management
Chief Financial Officer

Assistant Deputy Minister, International Affairs Branch
Chief, Audit & Evaluation
Chief Redress Officer, Integrity and Redress Secretariat
Exec. Director, Legal Services

Executive Vice President
Chief of Staff

President of the Canadian Institutes of Health Research
Executive Vice-President

Assoc. VP, Research, Knowledge Translation & Ethics
Assoc. VP, Governance & External Relations
Assoc. VP, Corporate Services
VP, Research Programs
Assoc. VP, Research Programs – Strategy

Science Council (chaired by the President)
Governing Council (President is an ex officio member of all Standing Committees)
Chair
Vice Chair

Executive Committee
Governance and Nominating Committee
Standing Committee on Ethics
Standing Committee on Finance
CIHR Audit Committee
Stem Cell Oversight Committee

CIHR Institutes
Scientific Director, Institute of Aging
Scientific Director, Institute of Cancer Research
Scientific Director, Institute of Circulatory and Respiratory Health
Scientific Director, Institute of Gender and Health
Scientific Director, Institute of Genetics
Scientific Director, Institute of Health Services and Policy Research
Scientific Director, Institute of Human Development, Child and Youth Health
Scientific Director, Institute of Indigenous Peoples' Health
Scientific Director, Institute of Infection and Immunity
Scientific Director, Institute of Musculoskeletal Health and Arthritis
Scientific Director, Institute of Neurosciences, Mental Health and Addiction
Scientific Director, Institute of Nutrition, Metabolism and Diabetes
Scientific Director, Institute of Population and Public Health

References

External links
 Public Health Agency of Canada
 Health Canada

Health